UFC 110: Nogueira vs. Velasquez was a mixed martial arts event held by the Ultimate Fighting Championship (UFC) on Sunday, 21 February 2010 in Sydney, New South Wales,  Australia, at Acer Arena. The event marked the UFC's first trip to Australia. The main card was scheduled for 2:00 pm Sunday in Sydney to cater to the U.S. audience, meaning that the event took place at the regular U.S. time (10:00 pm ET, on Saturday 20 February).

The event grossed $540,000 in merchandise sales, breaking the previous record of $498,000 at UFC 83. Total sales topped the previous Acer Arena record held by Iron Maiden.

Background
The long expected bout between Yoshihiro Akiyama and Wanderlei Silva did not take place at this event. Instead, Silva faced Michael Bisping.

A bout between Nate Marquardt and Chael Sonnen which was expected to take place on this card was moved to UFC 109. A bout between Keith Jardine and Rich Franklin had been discussed, but Jardine eventually fought the Ultimate Fighter 8 winner Ryan Bader.

Chris Lytle was expected to face Dong Hyun Kim, but Kim was forced off the card with an injury. Brian Foster stepped in to fight Lytle.

A bout between Elvis Sinosic and Chris Haseman was due to be the first ever all-Australian bout to take place in the UFC. However, a shoulder injury forced Sinosic out of the fight on 18 February, and bout was pulled from the card as a result.
Additionally, Ben Rothwell was sidelined by an illness, leading to Australian veteran Anthony Perosh stepping in to face Mirko Cro Cop.

Tickets for the event sold out on the first day they were available to the general public. It was, at the time, the second fastest sellout of an event in the history of the UFC, behind UFC 83 (which was the first ever UFC event in Canada). This record was later broken by UFC 127, the second event to be held in Australia. UFC 110 aired live on Australian free-to-air sports channel ONE HD.

Results

Bonus awards
Fighters were awarded $50,000 bonuses.

Fight of the Night: Joe Stevenson vs. George Sotiropoulos
Knockout of the Night: Cain Velasquez
Submission of the Night: Chris Lytle

See also

2010 in UFC
List of UFC events
Mixed martial arts in Australia

References

Ultimate Fighting Championship events
2010 in mixed martial arts
Mixed martial arts in Australia
Sports competitions in Sydney
2010 in Australian sport